The men's cruiserweight (86 kg/189.2 lbs) K-1 category at the W.A.K.O. World Championships 2007 in Belgrade was the third heaviest of the K-1 tournaments, involving ten fighters from two continents (Europe and Africa).  Each of the matches was three rounds of two minutes each and were fought under K-1 rules.

Due to the small number of fighters unsuitable for a sixteen-man tournament, six of the men had byes through to the quarter finals.  The tournament champion was Bosnian Dženan Poturak (brother of K-1 heavyweight Dževad) who defeated Croat Ivan Stanić in the final to win gold.  Defeated semi finalists Belarusian Siarhei Krauchanka and Azerbaijani Zaur Alakbarov both won bronze.

Results

See also
List of WAKO Amateur World Championships
List of WAKO Amateur European Championships
List of male kickboxers

References

External links
 WAKO World Association of Kickboxing Organizations Official Site

Kickboxing events at the WAKO World Championships 2007 Belgrade
2007 in kickboxing
Kickboxing in Serbia